KFXB-TV, virtual channel 40 (UHF digital channel 14), is a Christian Television Network (CTN) owned-and-operated station licensed to Dubuque, Iowa, United States, and serving the Eastern Iowa television market (Cedar Rapids–Waterloo–Iowa City–Dubuque). The station's studios are located on Main Street in downtown Dubuque, and its transmitter is located in extreme southwestern Grant County, Wisconsin (in the Madison television market).

History

The station signed on as KDUB-TV on June 1, 1970, on channel 40 as an ABC affiliate. The KDUB call letters was originally used by CBS affiliate KLBK-TV in Lubbock, Texas, from its 1952 sign-on until 1961. In 1972, station president and general manager Gerald Green was embroiled in a controversy with the Federal Communications Commission (FCC) over whether $19,000 he paid to an ABC network representative was a bribe. Green testified that he thought the money was a legitimate expense in obtaining the network affiliation. Green was later exonerated, but the ABC executive was found guilty of extorting payoffs. After encountering financial difficulties, the station went off the air on October 3, 1974. The dormant station was purchased by Lloyd Hearing Aid Corp. of Rockford, Illinois, and returned to the air on September 12, 1976.

The first and only television station to be based out of Dubuque, KDUB was originally based in an office building just south of Dubuque, near Key West, Iowa. The station eventually moved into offices on the ninth floor of the former Roshek's Department Store building in downtown Dubuque, and later moved to its current location on Main Street.

For a number of years, KDUB and KCRG-TV (channel 9) were in conflict with each other. KDUB eventually won a decision in which the Dubuque cable company was required to black out KCRG when the same shows were shown at the same time on both stations. At one point, KDUB sued claiming that KCRG's interference caused a proposed deal to sell the station to fall through.

In early 1995 the station entered into a management agreement with Second Generation of Iowa, owner of Cedar Rapids Fox affiliate KOCR-TV (channel 28, now Dabl affiliate KFXA). It was then decided to discontinue the ABC affiliation and convert KDUB to a semi-satellite of KOCR (which changed its callsign to KFXA), under the call letters KFXB (the call letter change took place on August 13); most programming was simulcast from KFXA, but KFXB would continue its news operation (at that time, KFXA had no newscast at all). Prior to this, KOCR served as the network's over-the air affiliate for most of the southern portion of the market while Foxnet (which had launched in 1991) served as the network's cable-only affiliate for the remainder of the market, including the cities of Waterloo and Dubuque (it was carried on cable channel 13 in Dubuque); between October 7, 1994 and August 12, 1995, Foxnet was carried on all cable systems in most of Eastern Iowa as KOCR was off the air during that time due to financial issues. The first season of the NFL on Fox was carried by Cedar Rapids CBS affiliate KGAN, which had a greater coverage area than KOCR. After a few years, it was decided to close down the Dubuque news operation, rendering KFXB a full satellite of KFXA. During this time the stations identified themselves as "KFXA-KFXB Fox 28/40."

In 2004, KFXB's owners, Dubuque TV Limited Partnership sold the station to the Christian Television Network, who switched the station to its primarily-religious programming. Fox programming would continue to be transmitted on KFXA—which would operate as the sole Fox affiliate for northeast Iowa. At that time, KFXB lost its longstanding channel 4 assignment on the Dubuque cable system to KFXA, with KFXB being moved to channel 14.

KFXB added cable coverage of the Cedar Rapids and Iowa City areas on Mediacom cable in 2005.

KFXB has been digital-only since February 17, 2009.

Subchannels
The station's digital signal is multiplexed:

References

External links

Television channels and stations established in 1976
1976 establishments in Iowa
FXB-TV
Christian Television Network affiliates